Quercus benthamii is a species of oak in the family Fagaceae. It is native to the cloud forests of Central America and southern Mexico. It is threatened by habitat loss.

Description
Quercus benthamii is typically large evergreen tree. Mature individuals can reach up to 40 meters in height.

Taxonomy
Quercus benthamii is placed in section Lobatae. The Talamanca oak, Quercus rapurahuensis Pittier ex Trel. , distributed in Costa Rica and Panama, is now considered a synonym of Q. benthamii.

Distribution and habitat
Quercus benthamii is a rare species, distributed in humid cloud forests from southern Mexico to western Panama.

It is sparsely distributed across its range. In Mexico it is found in the La Chinantla region of Oaxaca, located on the eastern slope of the Sierra Madre de Oaxaca, and in the Sierra Madre de Chiapas and Chiapas Highlands of Chiapas, between 1,500 and 3,000 meters elevation. It is also found in the montane cloud forest enclaves in Central America – Guatemala at 2,100 meters elevation, El Salvador at 2,500 m, Honduras from 1,800 to 2,800 meters elevation, Nicaragua from 450 to 1,700 meters elevation, Costa Rica at 2,400 m, and western Panama at 2,100 m. The estimated area of occupancy (AOO) for Q. benthamii is 584 km2, which may be an under-estimate.

Conservation
Quercus benthamii was assessed as "near threatened" in 2018 for the IUCN Red List. Its population trend is not known, but its habitat has been subject to continuous human disturbance across much of its range. Cloud forest enclaves have been reduced to small fragments. Threats include over-extraction of timber and firewood, cattle grazing, human-caused fires, and conversion of forest to pasture and coffee plantations. Cloud forest habitats are also threatened by climate change. Quercus rapurahuensis Pitt. ex Trel. was assessed in 1998 as "vulnerable", but has since been regarded as a synonym of Quercus benthamii.

References

benthamii
Flora of Costa Rica
Flora of El Salvador
Flora of Guatemala
Flora of Honduras
Flora of Southeastern Mexico
Flora of Southwestern Mexico
Flora of Nicaragua
Flora of Panama
Trees of Central America
Trees of Chiapas
Trees of Oaxaca
Flora of the Sierra Madre de Oaxaca
Sierra Madre de Chiapas
Flora of the Central American montane forests
Taxonomy articles created by Polbot
Cloud forest flora of Mexico
Oaks of Mexico
Flora of the Talamancan montane forests